Tamara Sivakova (born 16 August 1965) is a Paralympian athlete from Belarus competing mainly in the throwing events.

She first competed in the 1992 Summer Paralympics in Barcelona, Spain for the Unified Team there she won a gold medal in the discus throw for category B3 athletes and finished 5th in the pentathlon.

Four years later she competed in the 1996 Summer Paralympics in Atlanta, United States for Belarus.  Here she won a gold in the shot put F12 and a bronze in the discus F12 but again failed to medal in the pentathlon.

She competed at her third games in Sydney, Australia in 2000 where she won the silver medal in the F13 discus and failed to medal in the pentathlon.

In 2004 in Athens, Greece she finished as winner of the gold medal in the F12 shot put and silver medal in the F13 discus throw
She competed at her fifth Paralympics in 2008 in Beijing, China where she reversed her results of the previous games, winning the gold medal in the F12/13 discus throw and the silver medal in the F12/13 shot put.

Notes

External links
 

Paralympic athletes of Belarus
1965 births
Belarusian female discus throwers
Belarusian female shot putters
Paralympic athletes of the Unified Team
Athletes (track and field) at the 1992 Summer Paralympics
Athletes (track and field) at the 1996 Summer Paralympics
Athletes (track and field) at the 2000 Summer Paralympics
Athletes (track and field) at the 2004 Summer Paralympics
Athletes (track and field) at the 2008 Summer Paralympics
Paralympic gold medalists for the Unified Team
Paralympic gold medalists for Belarus
Paralympic silver medalists for Belarus
Paralympic bronze medalists for Belarus
Living people
Visually impaired discus throwers
Visually impaired shot putters
World record holders in Paralympic athletics
Medalists at the 1996 Summer Paralympics
Medalists at the 2000 Summer Paralympics
Medalists at the 2004 Summer Paralympics
Medalists at the 2008 Summer Paralympics
Medalists at the 1992 Summer Paralympics
Paralympic medalists in athletics (track and field)
Paralympic discus throwers
Paralympic shot putters
Belarusian people with disabilities
Blind people